Shrimp DeJonghe, a specialty of Chicago, is a casserole of whole peeled shrimp blanketed in soft, garlicky, sherry-laced bread crumbs. It can be served as an appetizer or a main course.

It has the oldest pedigree of Chicagoan cuisine, having originated in the late 19th or early 20th century at DeJonghe's Hotel and Restaurant, 12 E. Monroe St. (1899–1923). The recipe has been attributed to the owners, brothers Henri, Pierre and Charles DeJonghe, Belgian immigrants who came to Chicago to run a restaurant at the World's Columbian Exposition, or their chef, Emil Zehr.

See also
 Culture of Chicago
 List of casserole dishes

References

External links
Shrimp de Jonghe recipe - Chicago Tribune 1985
Fried shrimp and calamari

Cuisine of Chicago
Shrimp dishes
Cuisine of the Midwestern United States
Casserole dishes
American seafood dishes